The 1967 Giro di Lombardia cycling race took place on 21 October 1967, and was won by Filotex's Franco Bitossi. It was the 61st edition of the Giro di Lombardia "monument" classic race.

Results

References

 

Giro di Lombardia
Giro di Lombardia, 1967
Giro di Lombardia
1967 Super Prestige Pernod